John Blackwell "Sprat" Cobb (August 4, 1904 – September 9, 1966) was an American college basketball player at the University of North Carolina at Chapel Hill. Cobb is one of eight Tar Heels basketball players who have had their jersey retired, and was nicknamed "Mr. Basketball".

Early life
John Blackwell Cobb was born on August 4, 1904 in Durham, North Carolina to Venable Tobacco Company executive James S. Cobb and Nannie Orr. The Cobbs were of English ancestry and Orrs of Scottish ancestry.

University of North Carolina
Cobb was a member of the Kappa Sigma fraternity. Cobb and Cartwright Carmichael led the Tar Heels to their first undefeated season in 1924. Cobb went on to play for three straight Southern Conference titles (1924, 1925, 1926). He was also the first 3-time All-America selection in North Carolina history. Cobb was named national player of the year for 1926 by the Helms Athletic Foundation. The 1924 team was retroactively named national champion by the Helms Foundation in 1936. Their fast play and defense earned them the nickname the "White Phantoms", use as an alternative nickname for the Tar Heels into the 1940s.

After defeating Alabama in the Southern Conference tournament, some 500 students marched to Cobb's house in Durham and woke up the household with fight songs. He averaged 15 points a game, then an incredible stat. 6' 2" was also a large size for a player in his day.

Later life
Cobb's dreams of pursuing a coaching career were dashed when he had a motorcycle accident in 1929 and lost part of his lower right leg. Cobb did continue to coach Little League Baseball teams throughout much of his life.

References

External links
 

1904 births
1966 deaths
All-American college men's basketball players
American men's basketball players
Basketball players from North Carolina
Forwards (basketball)
North Carolina Tar Heels men's basketball players
Sportspeople from Greenville, North Carolina
Sportspeople from Durham, North Carolina
Woodberry Forest School alumni